The 1996 ISF Men's World Championship was an international softball tournament. The tournament was held in Midland, Michigan. It was the 9th time the World Championship took place. Twenty two nations competed, including defending champions Canada.

Final standings

References

ISF Men's World Championship
1996 ISF Men's World Championship
Sports competitions in Michigan
Men's Softball World Championship
Men's Softball World
Midland, Michigan
July 1996 sports events in the United States